The Blood Brothers (Traditional: 刺馬; Simplified: 刺马; Pinyin: Cì Mǎ) is a 1973 Hong Kong martial arts film directed by Chang Cheh.

Plot 
The Blood Brothers follows two aimless bandits Chang Wen Hsiang (David Chiang) and Huang Chang (Chen Kuan-tai) who attempt to rob Ma Xinyi (Ti Lung). Unable to defeat him, they join forces and are soon thrashing hoodlums and even taking over a nearby group of bandits. But soon it becomes apparent Ma's ambitions far out reach those of his friends, he seeks a position in local government.

Having left them behind they meet again. Now a general, Ma still in not about to let anything stand in the way of his goals - which now include defeating the 'long hair' bandits and Huang's wife Mi Lan (Ching Li). The attraction is mutual, with her seeing potential of this ambitious man. Whilst Chang and Huang are off fighting the bandits Ma and Mi have an affair and he arranges for Huang to be assassinated rather than let his position fall into disgrace.

As Chang recounts his tale to the local Marshall, held for the murder of his blood brother, Ma, the inevitability of his fate is always clear. After Ma's men take their revenge, Mi Lan is left alone to reflect over the good times and, conversely, all the strife she's caused.

Release
The Blood Brothers was released in Hong Kong on February 24, 1973.

Reception
At the 11th Golden Horse Awards, Ti Lung won the Special Award for Outstanding Performance for his work in The Blood Brothers.

From a contemporary reviews, Tony Rayns (Monthly Film Bulletin) stated that the film was "the least romantic of Chang Cheh's evocations of heroism in unheroic times". Rayns commented that this film was "the first time that Chang Cheh and his regular collaborator [Ni Kuang] have found a plot mechanism to express the oppression as compulsive as the variations on the hero-model. They are well served by their admirable cast, several of them playing against established type; and barring the odd anarchronism, the dubbing is for once excellent."

Aftermath and influence
The story of the film was also done in Peter Chan's film The Warlords (2007). Chan has stated that although The Blood Brothers was an influence, he denied that the film was a remake and changed the title of his film to avoid comparisons.

References

External links 
 
 
 The Blood Brothers at Hong Kong Cinemagic
David Chiang Fan Site - 

1973 films
Hong Kong martial arts films
Shaw Brothers Studio films
Kung fu films
Films directed by Chang Cheh
Films set in 19th-century Qing dynasty
1970s Hong Kong films